Robert Morgan (born November 11, 1973) is an American former professional stock car racing driver and team owner. He currently owns the GT Celebration Race Series, a road racing series. He formerly competed in the NASCAR Craftsman Truck Series as a driver from 1997 to 2001. In 1998, Morgan became a co-owner of Morgan-Dollar Motorsports along with David Dollar. He was involved in a collision during the Daytona 250 in 2000 that almost took driver Geoff Bodine's life.

Racing career

Motorsports career results

NASCAR
(key) (Bold – Pole position awarded by qualifying time. Italics – Pole position earned by points standings or practice time. * – Most laps led.)

Craftsman Truck Series

Winston West Series

References

External links
 

1973 births
NASCAR drivers
NASCAR team owners
Living people
People from Conway, Arkansas
Racing drivers from Arkansas